Cec Starr (20 July 1907 – 25 January 2005) was an Australian cricketer. He played in seven first-class matches for South Australia between 1926 and 1946.

See also
 List of South Australian representative cricketers

References

External links
 

1907 births
2005 deaths
Australian cricketers
South Australia cricketers
Cricketers from Adelaide